Aurora is the fourth studio album by Australian producer Ben Frost. It was released on 26 May 2014 by Bedroom Community. The album received acclaim from music critics and was listed by many publications as one of the best albums of the year. Several of its tracks were remixed and released in the 2014 V A R I A N T EP.

Critical reception

Accolades

Track listing

Charts

References

2014 albums
Ben Frost albums